Utley is an unincorporated community in Bastrop County, Texas, United States. According to the Handbook of Texas, the community had a population of 50 in 2000. It is located within the Greater Austin metropolitan area.

History
Utley was founded by James Harvey Wilbarger in the early 1850s as the site of a commissary and trading post for plantations in the community. Wilbarger named it for his wife, which was her maiden name. A post office was established at Utley in 1892 and remained in operation until 1922. It reopened that next year. There were two general stores in the community in 1896. Its population was 25 in 1914 but only had one general store. It jumped to 250 from the 1930s to the 1940s, which plunged to 30 at the end of the decade, which remained at that number through 1990 and grew to 50 in 2000 after being at that number in the 1960s.

Today, the community is now a put-in-point for canoeists on the Colorado River. The Wilbarger family also named a nearby creek.

Geography

Education
Utley had a school for Hispanic students in the 1930s. The west half of Utley today is served by the Elgin Independent School District and the east half by the Bastrop Independent School District.

In popular culture
Utley was the filming location for the 1996 film, Michael with John Travolta. The gas station/general store building was used for the scene of the Milk Bottle Motel. There they built several facades for the motel rooms as well as the milk bottle. Episode 509 of the TV series Fear the Walking Dead was also filmed in and around Utley.

References

Unincorporated communities in Bastrop County, Texas
Unincorporated communities in Texas